Tadeusz Tomaszewski  (26 November 1881 in Sacin – 10 August 1950 in London) was 33rd Prime Minister of Poland and 3rd Prime Minister of the Polish Government in Exile (1949-1950). He died in London.

References

1881 births
1950 deaths
People from Grójec County
Prime Ministers of Poland
Polish emigrants to the United Kingdom
20th-century Polish lawyers
Polish Freemasons